Ross S. Whaley was the second president of the State University of New York College of Environmental Science and Forestry, in Syracuse, New York, from 1984 to 1999. An economist by training, Whaley had previously been director of forest economics research at the United States Forest Service. Other prior institutional affiliations included faculty and administrative positions at the University of Massachusetts Amherst, Colorado State University, and Utah State University. Whaley served as president of the Society of American Foresters in 1991. Following his tenure as President of SUNY-ESF, Whaley served as chair of the Adirondack Park Agency from 2003 to 2007.

References

External links 
Some archives from Ross Whaley's tenure as President of SUNY ESF are located in the Archives of the SUNY College of Environmental Sciences and Forestry

State University of New York College of Environmental Science and Forestry faculty
Living people
Utah State University faculty
American foresters
Year of birth missing (living people)
Leaders of the State University of New York College of Environmental Science and Forestry
Economists from New York (state)
Adirondack Park
Colorado State University faculty
University of Massachusetts Amherst faculty